The local chief executives are the elected officers of the local government units (LGUs) in the Philippines as provided for under Book III of Republic Act No. 7160 also known as the Local Government Code of 1991, they are as follows:

 Barangay Captain (Punong Barangay/Barangay Chairman), Book III, Title I, Chapter 3, Article I, Section 389
 Municipal Mayor, Book III, Title II, Chapter 3, Article I, Section 444
 City Mayor, Book III, Title III, Chapter 3, Article I, Section 455
 Provincial Governor, Book III, Title III, Chapter 3, Article I, Section 465
 Chief Minister of Bangsamoro

References

Government of the Philippines